Franklin Wing (January 6, 1908 – July 6, 1994) was an American equestrian. He competed in two events at the 1948 Summer Olympics.

References

1908 births
1994 deaths
American male equestrians
Olympic equestrians of the United States
Equestrians at the 1948 Summer Olympics
Sportspeople from Guimaras